Waiting Game is an album by American jazz saxophonist Zoot Sims and Orchestra arranged by Gary McFarland featuring performances recorded in England in 1966 for the Impulse! label.

Track listing
All compositions by Gary McFarland except as indicated
 "Old Folks" (Dedette Lee Hill, Willard Robison) - 4:52 
 "I Wish I Knew" (Mack Gordon) - 4:11 
 "Once We Loved" - 2:46 
 "It's a Blue World" (George Forrest, Robert Wright) - 3:47 
 "September Song" (Kurt Weill, Maxwell Anderson) - 4:48 
 "Over the Rainbow" (Harold Arlen, Yip Harburg) - 5:02 
 "Stella by Starlight" (Victor Young, Ned Washington) - 4:36 
 "One I Could Have Loved" - 3:13 
 "You Go to My Head" (J. Fred Coots, Haven Gillespie) - 4:04 
 "Does the Sun Really Shine on the Moon?" - 5:46 
Recorded in London, England on November 28, 1966 (tracks 1-5 & 8-10), and November 30, 1966 (6 & 7)

Personnel
Zoot Sims - tenor saxophone, vocals
David Snell - harp
Gary McFarland – arranger
Kenny Napper, (tracks 6 & 7), Jack Parnell (tracks 1-5 & 8-10) - conductor
Unknown Orchestra
Technical
Robert Flynn - cover design
Arthur Halpern - cover photography
Nat Hentoff - liner notes

References

Impulse! Records albums
Zoot Sims albums
1966 albums
Albums arranged by Gary McFarland
Albums conducted by Jack Parnell
Albums produced by Bob Thiele
Albums produced by Gary McFarland